"Voulez-Vous" (French for "Do you want?") is a 1979 song by the Swedish group ABBA, written and composed by Benny Andersson and Björn Ulvaeus. Agnetha Fältskog and Anni-Frid Lyngstad shared the lead vocals. It is the second track on the group's 1979 album of the same name. In the UK and Ireland, "Voulez-Vous" was released as a double A-side, though nearly everywhere else, "Voulez-Vous" was a single A-side. The double A side single is, as of September 2021, ABBA's 13th-biggest song in the UK, including both pure sales and digital streams.

The song also features on the album Gold: Greatest Hits, first as a 4:21 edited version when the compilation was first released in 1992 and then in its full 5:09 version from 1999 onwards. "Angeleyes" is featured on the More Gold: More Hits compilation. "Voulez-Vous" was re-released as a single in 1992 to promote Gold: Greatest Hits. "Voulez-Vous" is also the only ABBA song to have been officially released as an extended dance remix – albeit only as a promo. The 6:07 version of the track, released as a double A-side 12-inch single by Atlantic Records in the United States in 1979, was included as a bonus track on the 2001 compilation The Definitive Collection.

A songwriting trip to the Bahamas saw the birth of this melody, and the proximity to Miami made it convenient to record the backing track at Criteria Studios with members of the disco group Foxy. Criteria Studios is where the Bee Gees made their disco-era records. "Voulez-Vous" is the only ABBA song (other than live recordings) to be recorded outside of Sweden.

Reception
Billboard described Voulez-Vous as one of ABBA's "most dynamic tracks", stating that it contains "almost Russian sounding musical accents". Cash Box said the song was "a return to shimmering Euro-pop with a chirpy disco beat and bright horns," and praised the vocal performance.

Compared to ABBA's hits both before and after, "Voulez-Vous" was not a major hit for the group. It did top the charts in Belgium, while reaching the Top 3 in Great Britain, Ireland and The Netherlands. It also peaked at No. 9 in France, Spain and Switzerland.

Track listings
7-inch vinyl
A: "Voulez-Vous"
B: "Angeleyes"

12-inch vinyl
A: "Voulez-Vous"
B: "Does Your Mother Know"

1992 CD re-issue
"Voulez Vous"
"Summer Night City"

Charts

Weekly charts

Year-end charts

Certifications and sales

Live performances and appearances in other media
"Voulez-Vous" is one of the numbers performed in the Mamma Mia! musical.

References

1979 singles
ABBA songs
Macaronic songs
Music videos directed by Lasse Hallström
Polar Music singles
Songs written by Benny Andersson and Björn Ulvaeus
Ultratop 50 Singles (Flanders) number-one singles